Seddon Conservation Park is a protected area in South Australia located  on Kangaroo Island.  It was dedicated in 1971 to protect a representative sample of the lateritic plateau vegetation of the central part of the island.

Description
The Eleanor River flows through the conservation park. The vegetation is mainly a woodland association of Eucalyptus leucoxylon and E. fasciculosa, with open shrubland of E. cosmophylla and E. baxteri over Allocasuarina muelleriana, Xanthorrhoea tateana and Melaleuca uncinata. The conservation park is classified as an IUCN Category III protected area.

See also
 Protected areas of South Australia

References

External links
Seddon Conservation Park webpage on protected planet

Protected areas of Kangaroo Island
Conservation parks of South Australia
1971 establishments in Australia
Protected areas established in 1971